The Phlaeobini are a tribe  of grasshoppers in the subfamily Acridinae.  The recorded distribution of genera includes: Africa, the Middle East and Asia.

Genera

The Orthoptera Species File lists:
Genus group Afrophlaeoba
 Afrophlaeoba Jago, 1983
 Brachyphlaeobella Jago, 1983
 Chlorophlaeobella Jago, 1983
 Chokwea Uvarov, 1953
 Chromochokwea Jago, 1983
 Paralobopoma Rehn, 1914
 Parodontomelus Ramme, 1929
 Platyverticula Jago, 1983

Genus group Duronia
 Duronia (insect) Stål, 1876
 Duroniella Bolívar, 1908
 Leopardia Baccetti, 1985 - monotypic L. bivittata Baccetti, 1985
 Oxyduronia Popov, 2019
Genus group Ocnocerus
 Anacteana Popov, 2019
 Hyperocnocerus Uvarov, 1953
 Ocnocerus Bolívar, 1889
 Panzia Miller, 1929
 Rhabdoplea Karsch, 1893
 Sumba (insect) Bolívar, 1909
Genus group not placed
 Cannula Bolívar, 1906
 Chlorophlaeoba Ramme, 1941
 Culmulus Uvarov, 1953
 Glyphoclonus Karsch, 1896
 Holopercna Karsch, 1891
 Mesophlaeoba Kumar & Usmani, 2015
 Oxyphlaeobella Ramme, 1941
 Phlaeoba Stål, 1861
 Phlaeobacris Willemse, 1932
 Phlaeobella Ramme, 1941
 Phlaeobida Bolívar, 1902
 Pseudophlaeoba Bolívar, 1914
 Pyrgophlaeoba Miller, 1929
 Sikkimiana Uvarov, 1940
 Sinophlaeoba Niu & Zheng, 2005
 Sinophlaeobida Yin & Yin, 2007
 Xerophlaeoba Uvarov, 1936

References

External Links
 

Orthoptera tribes
Acridinae